Megacorporation, mega-corporation, or megacorp, a term originally coined by Alfred Eichner in his book The Megacorp and Oligopoly: Micro Foundations of Macro Dynamics but popularized by William Gibson,
 derives from the combination of the prefix mega- with the word corporation. It has become widespread in cyberpunk literature. It is synonymous with syndicate, globalist- or transnational capital. It refers to a corporation (normally fictional) that is a massive conglomerate (usually private), holding monopolistic or near-monopolistic control over multiple markets (thus exhibiting both a horizontal and a vertical monopoly). Megacorps are so powerful that they are above the government laws, possess their own heavily armed (often military-sized) private armies, are operators of privatized police forces, hold "sovereign" territory, and even act as outright governments. They often exercise a large degree of control over their employees, taking the idea of "corporate culture" to an extreme.

Examples of megacorps in literature
Such organizations as a staple of science fiction long predate cyberpunk, appearing in the works of writers such as Philip K. Dick (Do Androids Dream of Electric Sheep?, 1968), Thea von Harbou (Metropolis, 1927), Robert A. Heinlein (Citizen of the Galaxy, 1957), Robert Asprin (The Cold Cash War, 1977), and Andre Norton (the Solar Queen novels). The explicit use of the term in the Traveller science fiction roleplaying game from 1977 predates Gibson's use of it.

Examples of megacorps in film

In the animated Pixar film WALL-E, the megacorporation Buy n' Large has completely supplanted every planetary government.

In the Avatar series of films, the Resources Development Administration (RDA) is a megacorporation that outmatches most governments in wealth, influence, and military power. The RDA has monopolized ownership of all extra-terrestrial colonies and assets, granted in perpetuity by an international committee.

Examples of megacorps in games 
In the sci-fi strategy game Stellaris, players can choose to control a megacorporation that has consumed all aspects of their alien government, with variable policies such as indentured servitude, media conglomerates, or even employee resurrection. 

In the video game The Outer Worlds, many megacorps purchase the rights to solar systems from Earth governments. Corporate colonies, being lightyears away from government influence, are effectively governed by their parent companies, with employment acting as citizenship.

Real-life examples

Although the term itself arose out of science fiction, certain real-life corporations, such as colonial-era chartered companies and zaibatsu, have achieved or approached megacorporation status in various ways. The private Dutch East India Company, for example, operated 40 warships and had 10,000 private soldiers to monitor its farflung spice empire, while the British East India Company controlled a large colonial empire and maintained a 300,000 strong standing army in the mid-19th century before the company was dissolved and its territories absorbed into the British Empire. The Hudson's Bay Company was once the world's largest landowner, exercising legal control and a trading monopoly on its territory known as Rupert's Land which consisted of 15% of the North American land mass.

Today many countries have competition laws (also known as antitrust laws) to prevent real-life corporations from having mega-corporation characteristics. On the other hand, some countries protect a certain industry deemed important by mandating that only a single company, usually state-owned, can operate in it. An example of the latter is Saudi Arabia, which gains the majority of its government revenues through its mega-corporation Saudi Aramco.

See also
 Company town
 Corporate warfare
 Corporatocracy
 Chaebol
 Evil corporation
 Keiretsu
 List of largest corporations
 Oligarchy
 Plutocracy

References

William Gibson
Fictional companies
Cyberpunk themes
Chartered companies